HMS Amazon, was a 36-gun frigate, built at Rotherhithe by (John and William) Wells & Co. in 1795 to a design by Sir William Rule. Carrying a main battery of 18-pounder long guns, she was the first of a class of four frigates. She spent her entire career in the Channel, part of the Inshore Squadron under Sir Edward Pellew. She was wrecked in Audierne Bay in 1797, following an engagement with the French ship-of-the-line, Droits de l'Homme.

Armament and construction
Amazon was one of four 36-gun, 18-pound, Amazon-class frigates built to a design by William Rule. She, and her sister ship , were ordered on 24 May 1794. They were 933  tons burthen a piece.

Work began in June at Rotherhithe by Wells & Co, when the  keel was laid down. Launched on 4 July 1795 Amazon was taken to Deptford where she was completed from 3–25 September. Including fitting, her construction had cost £24,681.

Amazon was built to carry a main battery of twenty-six  on her upper gun deck, eight  on the quarter deck and two on the forecastle. She additionally carried ten  carronades, six on the quarter deck and two on the forecastle. When fully manned, she had a complement of 264.

Service
In 1795, while under the command of Captain Robert Carthew Reynolds, she was part of the Inshore Squadron under Sir Edward Pellew watching the French port of Brest to report any attempt by the French fleet to leave port. Cruising off Ushant, late in the afternoon of 13 April 1796, a ship was seen to windward. Pellew, ordered Révolutionnaire to sail an intercepting course while the rest of the squadron gave chase. Révolutionnaire eventually cut off the quarry, which turned out to be the French frigate, Unité, and after a brief exchange of fire, forced her to surrender. A week later, on 20 April, Amazon was again in pursuit of an enemy frigate. With Argo in Plymouth and Révolutionnaire on her way home with her prize, the three remaining British frigates were lying-to off The Lizard, when 40-gun Virginie was spotted. Indefatigable, being the best sailer, was first to engage, after a  chase, lasting 15 hours. When Amazon and Concorde caught up, the French ship surrendered. Then on 13 June, Amazon contributed to the capture of the 16-gun Betsy and the 14-gun Les Trois Couleurs off Brest.

The squadron sighted two French navy corvettes about eight leagues of Ushant and after a 24-hour chase on 12 June 1796 succeeded in capturing both. One was Blonde, of ten guns and 95 men, and the other was Trois Couleurs, of ten guns and 75 men. They were provisioned for a six-week cruise, and two days out of Brest but had captured nothing. Amazon shared the prize money with the rest of the squadron. The prize money notice referred to "La Blonde, alias Le Betsey".

On 11 December, Amazon was despatched with news that seven French ships of the line had arrived in Brest. This was part of the preparation for an invasion of Ireland. The French fleet left harbour and evaded the main British blockade fleet and sailed for Bantry Bay. However, storms scattered them and most returned to France having accomplished very little.

In the action of 13 January 1797, Amazon, in company with Pellew's ship Indefatigable, encountered the French ship Droits de l'Homme, a 74-gun ship of the line. Normally, frigates would not engage a ship of the line as they would be severely outgunned. However, there was a heavy sea and the French ship could not open her lower deck gunports for fear of flooding. This reduced her broadside considerably.

Pellew was seven miles ahead of Amazon when he first attacked the Droits de l'Homme. An hour and a half later Amazon came up and poured a broadside into the Frenchman's quarter. The two frigates attacked her from either side yawing to rake her while avoiding much of her return fire. At 4.20 am on 14 January land was suddenly sighted ahead and the frigates broke off the attack and headed in opposite directions. Amazon, going north, and more severely damaged, was unable to wear and ran aground at Audierne Bay, Isle Bas. Three crew had been killed during the battle and six more drowned, but the rest were able to reach shore. There the French captured them. The heavy seas pounding her on the beach destroyed Amazon; the Droits de l'Homme, badly damaged in the battle, was also wrecked, with heavy casualties.

The court martial on 29 September 1797, routinely held by the Navy after the loss of any vessel, honourably acquitted Captain Reynolds and his officers of negligence in the loss of the ship.

Citations

References

 Winfield, Rif (2008) British Warships in the Age of Sail, 1793-1817: design, construction, careers and fates; 2nd ed. Seaforth Publishing

External links 
 HMS Amazon, Naval Database

Maritime incidents in 1797
Frigates of the Royal Navy
Shipwrecks in the Bay of Biscay
Ships built in Rotherhithe
1795 ships